Teuvo Aura's second cabinet was the 54th government of Finland, which existed from 29 October 1971 to 23 February 1972. It was a caretaker government whose Prime Minister was Teuvo Aura.

Ministers

References

Aura
1971 establishments in Finland
1972 disestablishments in Finland
Cabinets established in 1971
Cabinets disestablished in 1972